Württembergische Landesbühne Esslingen  is a theatre in Esslingen am Neckar, Baden-Württemberg, Germany.

Theatres in Baden-Württemberg